Frank Dean Butler (July 18, 1860 – July 18, 1945), was a professional baseball player who played outfielder in the Major Leagues.

External links

1860 births
1945 deaths
Major League Baseball outfielders
New York Giants (NL) players
19th-century baseball players
Macon Central City players
Atlanta Atlantas players
Memphis Giants players
Savannah Modocs players
Scranton Coal Heavers players
Nashville Seraphs players
Columbus Buckeyes (minor league) players
Columbus Senators players
Grand Rapids Furnituremakers players
Baseball players from Savannah, Georgia